Percival Charles Hellyer (5 March 1910 – 2001) was an English footballer who played as a winger for Rochdale. He also played reserve team and non-league football for various other clubs.

References

Oxford City F.C. players
Crystal Palace F.C. players
Tunbridge Wells F.C. players
Rochdale A.F.C. players
Bradford F.C. players
Metropolitan Police F.C. players
1910 births
2001 deaths
Footballers from Oxford
English footballers
Association footballers not categorized by position